Nenomoshia poetica is a moth of the family Tortricidae first described by Edward Meyrick in 1909. It is found in India, Sri Lanka, the Mariana Islands and Australia.

References

Moths of Asia
Moths described in 1909